Eremophila enata is a flowering plant in the figwort family, Scrophulariaceae and is endemic to central areas of Western Australia. It is a low, spreading shrub with serrated leaves and purplish to pinkish flowers.

Description
Their edges are serrated and the surfaces covered with glandular hairs.

The sepal at the rear is egg-shaped and slightly shorter and wider than the others. The petals are purple to pinkish-purple on the outside and white inside the tube with purple or reddish-brown spots. The outside of the petal tube is covered with glandular hairs and the inside of the tube is filled with woolly hairs. The 4 stamens are fully enclosed in the petal tube. Flowering occurs from August to October and is followed by fruits which are oval to almost spherical, hairy,  in diameter and have a papery covering.

Taxonomy and naming
The species was first formally described by Robert Chinnock in 2007 and the description was published in Eremophila and Allied Genera: A Monograph of the Plant Family Myoporaceae. The specific epithet (enata) is a Latin word meaning "arisen" or "born" referring this species' similarity to E. gilesii.

Distribution and habitat
Eremophila enata occurs near Wiluna and Windidda in the Gascoyne, Murchison and Pilbara biogeographic regions. It grows in clay soils usually in mulga woodland.

Conservation status
Eremophila enata is classified as "not threatened" by the Western Australian Government Department of Parks and Wildlife.

Use in horticulture
This eremophila bears masses of flowers, often after rain following a long dry spell. Its attractive flowers suit it to most gardens. It can be propagated from cuttings and is best grown in well-drained soil in full sun. It tolerates drought and moderate frost, with any damage soon replaced by new growth.

References

enata
Eudicots of Western Australia
Plants described in 2007
Endemic flora of Western Australia
Taxa named by Robert Chinnock